R. formosa may refer to:

 Ramaria formosa, a coral fungus
 Randia formosa, a New World plant
 Rhodophaea formosa, a snout moth
 Ruellia formosa, a plant native to Brazil